Harley Tat is an American television producer, writer, journalist, and author.

Writer and producer
A Seattle native, Tat began his career in Los Angeles as a television news magazine segment producer, working on A Current Affair, Extra and Hard Copy where he was a director as well.

During his time at A Current Affair, Tat produced a segment about Wanda Holloway, the Texas mother accused of murdering her daughter's cheerleading rival.  Tat went on to appear as himself in the HBO television film about the event, The Positively True Adventures of the Alleged Texas Cheerleader-Murdering Mom. The film starred Holly Hunter and Beau Bridges and was directed by Michael Ritchie (Bad News Bears, Fletch, Down Hill Racer), and written by Jane Anderson (Mad Men, The Wonder Years), the film earned Hunter an Emmy for acting, Bridges an Emmy and a Golden Globe for acting, and Anderson an Emmy for writing.

Tat moved from news magazines to unscripted relationship shows, serving as executive producer for over a thousand episodes of Blind Date and The 5th Wheel for NBCUniversal,.  Tat is the creator and executive producer of the "You've Been Sacked" segments on Monday Night Football. He was the executive producer of more than 150 episodes of Whacked Out Sports, Whacked Out Videos, Knockout Sportsworld, and Sports Crash. In addition he was the executive producer for "My Viral Video" and "Dear Santa" and "Mobile Home Disaster"  which he also directed.

Tat served as executive producer of the independent film Jess + Moss, which was accepted at the 2011 Sundance Film Festival.

Novelist
Tat wrote The New Boy, a fictitious account of a troubled rugby player in Washington state, when it was released it ranked #1 in Rugby for both paperback and kindle editions.

Media entrepreneur
In recent years, Tat co-founded (along with Jim Kirk) a media exploration company called Magic Ranch Entertainment. The media endeavor utilizes its owner's experience
in unscripted television, film, advertising and live events to package, produce and distribute brand-infused content. Magic Ranch Media Explorers, and its parent company  Corporate Magic, have worked with global brands such as Coca-Cola, Mazda, and the Boy Scouts of America among many other companies.

References

American television producers
Living people
Year of birth missing (living people)